Mario Mongelli (born 20 October 1958) is a French former professional football player and manager.

Playing career 
Mongelli was an exponent of the Paris Saint-Germain Academy. He played his first and only match for the Paris Saint-Germain senior team on 4 February 1979, a 4–1 loss against Saint-Étienne. He was substituted at the 77th minute of the match, and never played for PSG again in his career. In the summer of 1979, he joined Paris FC.

In the next 9 years of his career, Mongelli went on to play for Fontainebleau, Dunkerque, Paris FC (for a second time), and Morangis-Chilly. In his one season at Morangis-Chilly, he had the role of player-manager.

Post-playing career 
Mongelli went on to coach Morangis-Chilly for 12 years from 1993 to 2005, while at the same time being a player for the "veterans" team of the club. After leaving in 2005, he began a scooter company called "Aux 4M" that he ran with his brother in the town of Chilly-Mazarin.

Career statistics

References 

1958 births
Living people
People from Villejuif
Footballers from Val-de-Marne
French footballers
French football managers
Association football forwards
Association football midfielders
Ligue 1 players
Ligue 2 players
French Division 3 (1971–1993) players
Paris Saint-Germain F.C. players
Paris FC players
RCP Fontainebleau players
USL Dunkerque players
Association football player-managers
FC Morangis-Chilly players
FC Morangis-Chilly managers